Dohna is a town in the Sächsische Schweiz-Osterzgebirge district, Saxony, Germany.

Dohna may also refer to:

People 
 
 Alexander zu Dohna-Schlobitten (1661–1728), field marshal
 Alexander zu Dohna-Schlobitten (1899–1997), officer and businessman
 Christian Albert, Burgrave and Count of Dohna, general
 Christopher von Dohna (1583–1637), politician 
 Christopher I, Burgrave and Count of Dohna-Schlodien (1665–1733), general and diplomat
 Christopher Delphicus zu Dohna (1628–1668), diplomat
 Frederick, Burgrave of Dohna (1621–1688), general and diplomat
 Friedrich Ferdinand Alexander zu Dohna-Schlobitten (1771–1831), Prussian politician
 Heinrich Graf zu Dohna-Schlobitten (1882–1944), general and resistance fighter
 Karl Friedrich Emil zu Dohna-Schlobitten (1784–1859), field marshal
 Nikolaus zu Dohna-Schlodien (1879–1956), naval officer and author
 Richard zu Dohna-Schlobitten (1843–1916), counsellor of Kaiser Wilhelm II

Other 
 Dohna Castle, Germany
 Dohna Feud, a historical dispute

German-language surnames